Luís Carlos Novo Neto (born 26 May 1988) is a Portuguese professional footballer who plays as a centre-back for Sporting CP.

Club career
Born in Póvoa de Varzim, Neto joined his hometown club Varzim SC's youth ranks at the age of ten. He appeared for them in the second division, being a backup or third choice in four of his five seasons. His competitive debut came on 10 February 2007 in a 2–1 home win against S.L. Benfica in the sixth round of the Taça de Portugal, when he played two minutes.

In July 2011, Neto moved to Primeira Liga side C.D. Nacional on a free transfer. He immediately made an impact for his new team, and attracted interest from the likes of FC Porto and Arsenal during the following off-season. Italy's A.C. Siena eventually signed him, for €1.7 million.

Neto was a starter during the first half of the campaign, scoring his first goal in Serie A in a 1–3 home defeat against A.S. Roma. On 1 February 2013 he moved again, joining compatriots Bruno Alves and Danny at FC Zenit Saint Petersburg. He scored his first goal for the Russian club on 19 May, his team's first in a 3–1 home victory over FC Volga Nizhny Novgorod.

On 31 August 2017, Neto signed for Fenerbahçe SK in a season-long move. On 11 March 2019, Sporting CP announced that he would join them on a permanent three-year contract on 1 July.

International career
Neto appeared with the Portugal under-21 team at the 2009 Lusophony Games. He played all four matches during the tournament, as they won the silver medal.

On 4 October 2012, Neto was called up for the first time to the full side, for 2014 FIFA World Cup qualifiers against Russia and Northern Ireland. He made his debut on 6 February of the following year, partnering Zenit teammate Alves in a 2–3 friendly loss to Ecuador in Guimarães.

On 19 May 2014, Neto was named in the final 23-man squad for the tournament in Brazil, but played no games in an eventual group stage exit. He was also selected for the 2017 FIFA Confederations Cup by manager Fernando Santos. On 2 July, in his only appearance in the latter competition, he scored an own goal against Mexico in the third place play-off (a 2–1 win in Moscow).

Neto was included in a preliminary 35-man squad for the 2018 World Cup, but he did not make the final cut.

Club statistics

Honours

Zenit St. Petersburg
Russian Premier League: 2014–15, 2018–19
Russian Cup: 2015–16
Russian Super Cup: 2015, 2016

Sporting CP
Primeira Liga: 2020–21
Taça da Liga: 2020–21, 2021–22
Supertaça Cândido de Oliveira: 2021

Portugal
FIFA Confederations Cup third place: 2017

Individual
Segunda Liga Breakthrough Player of the Year: 2010–11

References

External links

1988 births
Living people
People from Póvoa de Varzim
Sportspeople from Porto District
Portuguese footballers
Association football defenders
Primeira Liga players
Liga Portugal 2 players
Varzim S.C. players
C.D. Nacional players
Sporting CP footballers
Serie A players
A.C.N. Siena 1904 players
Russian Premier League players
FC Zenit Saint Petersburg players
Süper Lig players
Fenerbahçe S.K. footballers
Portugal youth international footballers
Portugal under-21 international footballers
Portugal international footballers
2014 FIFA World Cup players
2017 FIFA Confederations Cup players
Portuguese expatriate footballers
Expatriate footballers in Italy
Expatriate footballers in Russia
Expatriate footballers in Turkey
Portuguese expatriate sportspeople in Italy
Portuguese expatriate sportspeople in Russia
Portuguese expatriate sportspeople in Turkey